Les Chiens (The Dogs) is a Canadian indie rock band from Quebec.  The lead singer  and guitarist is Éric Goulet. The bass player is Nicolas Jouannaut. Olivier Rénaldin and Marc Chartrain have both played drums with the group..

History
Goulet, Jouannaut and Rénaldin came together in 1997 to form Les Chiens. The band's album, Nuit Dérobée, was released in late 2000, to positive reviews.

Les Chiens was signed briefly to the labels La Tribu and C4, but most of their recordings were released independently.

In 2008, Les Chiens released an album, Le Long Sentier, on AudioGram. By this time Marc Chartrain was contributing the percussion.

In February, 2015, after a long hiatus, Les Chiens released a five-song EP, Les Chiens.  In 2016, the group continues to perform and record.

Discography
2000: Nuit Dérobée (October 10)
2002: Music-Hall 2001 (April 9)
2003: Debout (April 15)
2005: Rösk (September 20)
2008: Le Long Sentier
2015: Les Chiens mini-album

See also

Music of Canada
Music of Quebec
Canadian rock
List of bands from Canada

References

External links
Les Chiens at MySpace

Musical groups established in 1997
Musical groups from Quebec
Canadian indie rock groups